Buildings and structures on the defunct Marylhurst University campus include:

 Aquinas Hall
 B.P. John Administrative Building
 Baxter Hall
 Clark Commons
 Davignon Hall
 Flavia Hall
 Marian Hall
 Mayer Art Building
 O'Hara Hall
 Shoen Library
 St. Anne's Chapel
 St. Catherine Hall
 Thompson Hall
 Villa Maria Hall

See also

 List of Portland State University buildings
 List of Reed College buildings
 List of University of Oregon buildings
 List of University of Portland buildings
 List of Willamette University buildings

Marylhurst University
Marylhurst University
Marylhurst University buildings
Marylhurst University